The Foundational Questions Institute, styled FQxI (formerly FQXi), is an organization that provides grants to "catalyze, support, and disseminate research on questions at the foundations of physics and cosmology." It was founded in 2005 by cosmologists Max Tegmark and Anthony Aguirre, who hold the positions of Scientific Directors.
It has run four worldwide grant competitions (in 2006, 2008, 2010, and 2013), the first of which provided US$2M to 30 projects. It also runs frequent essay contests open to the general public with $40,000 in prizes awarded by a jury panel and the best texts published in book format.

FQxI is an independent, philanthropically funded non-profit organization, run by scientists for scientists.

The $6.2 million seed funding was donated by the John Templeton Foundation, whose goal is to reconcile science and religion. Tegmark has stated that the money came with "no strings attached"; The Boston Globe stated FQxI is run by "two well-respected researchers who say they are not religious. The institute's scientific advisory board is also filled with top scientists." Critics of the John Templeton Foundation such as Sean Carroll have also stated they were satisfied that the FQxI is independent.

Notable members 
FQXi members include

 Scott Aaronson
 Anthony Aguirre
 Yakir Aharonov
 John Carlos Baez
 Julian Barbour
 John D. Barrow
 Jacob Biamonte
 Raphael Bousso
 Sean Carroll
 David Chalmers
 Paul Davies
 David Deutsch
 George F. R. Ellis
 Nicolas Gisin
 Brian Greene
 Sabine Hossenfelder
 Robert Lawrence Kuhn
 Seth Lloyd
 George Musser
 Roger Penrose
 Lisa Randall
 Martin Rees
 Carlo Rovelli
 Lee Smolin
 Leonard Susskind
 Gerard 't Hooft
 Max Tegmark
 Vlatko Vedral
 Steven Weinberg
 Frank Wilczek
 Stephen Wolfram
 Anton Zeilinger
 Wojciech Zurek

References

External links
 Institute website

Physics organizations